Mindoro is the seventh largest and eighth-most populous island in the Philippines. With a total land area of 10,571 km2 ( 4,082 sq.mi ) and has a population of 1,408,454 as of 2020 census. It is located off the southwestern coast of Luzon and northeast of Palawan. Mindoro is divided into two provinces: Occidental Mindoro and Oriental Mindoro. San Jose is the largest settlement on the island with a total population of 143,430 inhabitants as of 2015. The southern coast of Mindoro forms the northeastern extremum of the Sulu Sea.

Geography
Mindoro is the seventh (7th) largest island in the Philippines. It is divided by two provinces Occidental Mindoro and Oriental Mindoro.

Topography

Mindoro Mountain Range List of highest Peaks by elevation.

 Mount Halcon 
 Mount Baco 
 Mount Wood 
 Mount Sinclair 
 Mount Patrick 
 Mount Indie 
 Mount Merril 
 Mount Calavite 
 Mount Tallulah 
 Babuy Peak 
 Mount Iglit 
 Mount Roosevelt 
 Mount Burburungan 
 Mount Malasimbo 
 Mount Balatic 
 Mount Talipanan 
 Mt. Abra de Ilog 
 Mount Mearns 
 Mount Alinyaban

River System

List of major river in Mindoro by length.

 Bucayao River 
 Lumintao River 
 Bongabong River 
 Busuanga River  
 Mantangcob River 
 Balingkawing River 
 Amnay River 
 Mongpong River 
 Mag-asawang Tubig 
 Pagbahan River 
 Arigoy River 
 Lantuyan River 
 Pandurucan River 
 Pameyas River 
 Santa Cruz River 
 Anahawin River 
 Abra de Ilog River 
 Naujan River 
 Calapan River

Etymology
The name Mindoro was likely a corruption of the native name "Minolo". Domingo Navarette ('Tratados...', 1676) wrote "The island which the natives call Minolo is named Mindoro by the Spaniards..." (trans. by Blair and Robertson).

History

In past times, it has been called Ma-i or Mait by Han Chinese traders. Indigenous groups are called Mangyans. The Spaniards called the place as Mina de Oro (meaning "gold mine") from where the island got its current name. According to the late historian William Henry Scott, an entry in the official history of the Sung Dynasty for the year 972 mentions Ma-i as a state which traded with China. Other Chinese records referring to Ma-i or Mindoro appear in the years that follow.

The products that Mindoro traders exchanged with the Chinese included "beeswax, cotton, true pearls, tortoiseshell, medicinal betelnuts and yu-ta [jute?] cloth" for Chinese porcelain, trade gold, iron pots, lead, copper, colored glass beads and iron needles.

The island was invaded and conquered by the Sultanate of Brunei and housed Moro settlements before the Spanish invaded and Christianized the population. Afterward, the area was depopulated due to wars between the Spaniards and the Moros from Mindanao who sought to enslave the Hispanized people and to re-Islamize the island. Consequently, most of the population fled to nearby Batangas and the once rich towns of Mindoro fell to ruin. In the seventeenth century, Giovanni Francesco Gemelli Careri visited the island.
In 1898, Mindoro joined in the Philippine Revolution against Spain due to the influx of rebels settling into the island from Cavite and Bataan. Local patriotism died down however during the American occupation of the Philippines and the Japanese era.

The island was the location of the Battle of Mindoro in World War II.

Nevertheless, upon Philippine independence, the area recovered and from 1920 to 1950, the island was a single province with Calapan as the provincial capital. In 1950, it was partitioned into its two present-day provinces, Occidental Mindoro and Oriental Mindoro, following a referendum.

Economy

The economy of Mindoro is largely based on agriculture. Products consist of a wide variety of fruits, such as citrus, bananas, lanzones, rambutan and coconuts, grains (rice and corn), sugarcane, peanuts, fish (catfish, milkfish and tilapia), livestock and poultry. Logging and the mining of marble and copper also thrive. Only 5% of the original forest remains as a result of extensive logging, prevalent agricultural practices, and population growth.

Tourism is a lucrative business as well, with locations such as Apo Reef National Park, Lubang Island, Puerto Galera, Sabang Beach and Mount Halcon. Puerto Galera's beaches are the island's most known tourist attraction and are widely visited.

An important aspect of the economy in Mindoro is mining, mostly performed by outside companies owned by foreign countries. While the foreign countries make most of the money from these mines, the Philippine government still receives some economic and financial benefit from allowing them to mine on their lands. These companies include Pitkin Petroleum, a US-based company which is looking for nickel, oil, and gas in Mindoro, Crew Development Corporation, a Canada-based corporation mining nickel and other precious metals, and Intex, a Norwegian-based company operating the Mindoro Nickel Project. This project is supposed to last 15 years and should produce over 100 million tons of ore by the end of the project. Unfortunately, while the mines might be profitable for the national government, they have caused problems to the environment and the indigenous tribes living in Mindoro.

Environment 

Mining in Mindoro poses a significant risk to the island's environment. Local and international mining interests have disregarded the island's ecology to gain access to the rich tungsten veins that exist below the surface. Intex, a Norwegian Mining Company attempted to begin prospecting for tungsten deposits, but was halted by a regional environmental protection ordinance. Small scale, legal and illegal, environmentally degrading mining operations still persist throughout the island due to a lack of enforcement by the local police.

Culture
The principal language in Mindoro is Tagalog, although in some parts it has been greatly influenced by the native Mangyan and Visayan languages. Visayan and Mangyan languages, too, are spoken on the island, as are Ilocano, Bicolano, and some foreign languages – e.g., English, Hokkien (a national dialect of Chinese), and to a lesser extent, Spanish.

The following indigenous languages (all of them being part of the Philippine branch of the Malayo-Polynesian languages family, like also like Ilocano, Bicolano, and the nationally designated official Filipino dialect of Tagalog) are spoken in Mindoro:
Northern Mindoro languages – 16,000 speakers
Iraya – 10,000 speakers
Alangan – 2,150 speakers
Tadyawan – 4,200 speakers
Southern Mindoro languages – 30,000 speakers
Buhid – 8,000 speakers
Tawbuid – 8,000 speakers
Hanuno'o – 14,000 speakers
Visayan languages
Ratagnon language – 2 speakers

Only the indigenous Mangyan language spoken in the southern part of the island is not part of the Philippine branch, but it is still a Malayo-Polynesian languages, historically developed separately from a common Proto-Malay substrate but under the influence of very ancient and more extensive contacts with Sino-Tibetan languages and cultures (from which a significant part of the native tribes seem to originate), and to a lesser extent with Indo-Aryan languages. Today, however, their local language is under strong influence of other Philippines languages (and notably with dominant Tagalog) and the more recent influence of English.

The common religions on the island fall under Christianity. The religion of the indigenous Mangyan population is animism. Though they are into animism as a principal religion, the Roman Catholic Church in some of Mindoro's parts is also active, so are a few independent subdivisions, like Iglesia ni Cristo and Philippine Independent Church, as well as the Baptist Church.

Fauna
Mindoro is also home to the tamaraw or Mindoro dwarf buffalo (Bubalus mindorensis), which is endemic to the island. The tamaraw is a bovine related to the water buffalo (carabao) and is an endangered species.

Bibliography
 C.Michael Hogan. 2011. Sulu Sea. Encyclopedia of Earth. Eds. P.Saundry & C.J.Cleveland. Washington DC

References

External links

"Map of Mindoro" showing towns and major mountain tops
Mindoro Tourists and Exploration

 
Islands of Luzon
Landforms of the Sulu Sea
Islands of Occidental Mindoro
Islands of Oriental Mindoro